The Military Secretary to the India Office was responsible for the recruitment of British and other European nationals to the officer ranks of the Indian Army.

Military Secretaries to the India Office
The Military Secretaries were as follows:

Major James Salmond 1809–1837
Philip Melvill 1837–1858
Colonel William Baker, 1859–1861
Major-General Sir Thomas Pears, 1861–1877
Colonel Allen Johnson, 1877–1889
Major-General Sir Oliver Newmarch, 1889–1899
Major-General Sir Edward Stedman, 1899–1907
Lieutenant-General Sir O'Moore Creagh, 1907–1909
Lieutenant-General Sir Beauchamp Duff, 1909–1914
General Sir Edmund Barrow, 1914–1917
Lieutenant-General Sir Herbert Cox, 1917–1920
Lieutenant-General Sir Alexander Cobbe, 1920–1926
Field Marshal Sir Claud Jacob, 1926–1930
General Sir Alexander Cobbe, 1930–1931
Major-General Sydney Muspratt, 1931–1933
Lieutenant-General Sir John Coleridge, 1933–1936
Major-General Sir Roger Wilson, 1936–1937
Lieutenant-General Sir Sydney Muspratt, 1937–1941
Major-General Rob Lockhart, 1941–1943
Lieutenant-General George Molesworth, 1943–1944
General Sir Mosley Mayne, 1945–1947
Lieutenant-General Sir Geoffry Scoones, 1947

References

Military appointments
Military of British India
1809 establishments in the British Empire
British military appointments